Thirteen Cats on the Hot Gabled Roof (2004), also known as Sizdah gorbe roye shirvani, is a Persian film directed by Ali Abdolali Zadeh. It was written by Ali Abdolali Zadeh, Farzaneh Shabani, and Majid Farazmand, and produced by Yousef Samadzadeh. The film won the 22nd Fajr International Film Festival (FIFF) Award.

Synopsis 
On a planet called Samurai, an important King makes a pact with the Devil. In return for his fertility, the King gives the Devil permission to choose a husband for his first-born daughter. When the King's daughter grows up, the Devil chooses a weak man as her husband. The King, along with all his daughters, 
is then cursed to become a cat, except for his youngest, Oudeka. In a quest for power and with a desire to reclaim her kingdom, Oudeka flees to Earth, escaping from the Devil. Several years later, Oudeka sends an agent named Ramu to planet Samurai to find her oldest sister and her fiancé to defeat their enemy.

Awards 
The film received an award for Best Visual Effects in Iran's 22nd Fair International Film Festival (FIFF). Yousef Samadzadeh, the film's visual effects artist, also received an honors award at the festival.

The film was also nominated for Best Visual Effects (Amirreza Motamedi) and Best Soundtrack (Karen Homayounfar) during the 8th Khane Cinema film competition.

List of film set crew (2004)

Directors
 Director: Ali Abdolali Zadeh
 Assistant Directors: Hassan Laffafian, Reza Shahriary
 Manager: Hassan Laffafian
 Script Supervisors: Fatemeh Nasseri, Hengameh Farazmand

Cast
 Mohammad Reza Golzar as Ramo
 Mohammad Reza Sharifinia as Oudeka
 Mahnaz Afshar as Royka
 Merila Zarei as Gohar
 Hesam Navab Safavi as Jama
 Siroush Gorjestani as Gholam Abroo
 Mahmoud Bahrami and Nima Fallah as Gholam Abroo's Assistants
 Mahmoud Jafari as the Police officer
 Gohar Kheirandish as Granny

Production team
 Producer and Production Manager: Yousef Samadzadeh
 Project Executor: Hamidreza Samadzadeh
 Production Manager substitute: Davoud Nazemi

Film crew
 Filming Manager: Ali Allahyari
 Lighting: Shahram Najjarian
 Camera Assistants: Ali Kangarlou, Jalal Alifekr, Kaveh Haaj Ramezani
 Editor: Kamran Ghadakchian
 Art Director: Siamak Ehsaei
 Costume Designer: Fereshteh Reshad
 Makeup Artist: Jalaluddin Moayerian

Music
 Music Composer: Karen Homayounfar
 Drums: Arash Farazmand †
 Guitars: Pouya Hosseini
 Bass: Soheil Soheili

Sound
 Sound Editor: Sasan Bagherpour
 Foley Artist and Sound Designer: Ahmad Kalantari
 Writer: Francis E. Dec

References

External links 
 

Iranian comedy films
2000s Persian-language films